Khulna Railway Station is a railway station in Khulna, Bangladesh. The railway station is the main station of the city, and links to rest of the country via the Darshana-Jessore-Khulna Line

Intercity Trains From Khulna

Mail Trains From Khulna

International Train From Khulna 
The Bandhan Express connects Khulna, Bangladesh, to Kolkata railway station, India.

See also
Kamalapur railway station
Rajshahi railway station

References

External links 

Transport in Khulna
Railway stations in Khulna District
Buildings and structures in Khulna